Smart Balance is a company that manufactures products including margarine substitutes, flavored microwave popcorn, and peanut butter.

Products
The products claim to have no partially hydrogenated vegetable oils added, no trans fat, and to be comparable in quality to vegetable oil based products.

The oils used in Smart Balance products contain low levels of naturally occurring trans fats, about 70 mcg of trans fat per serving. Some blends in this line include fish oil, while some include only vegetable-based ingredients. The oil blend used in some of the products was developed at Brandeis University.

History
In 2012, Smart Balance acquired Udi’s Healthy Foods, and the parent company was renamed Boulder Brands.

References

External links
Smart Balance web site

Food and drink companies of the United States
Companies listed on the Nasdaq
Food and drink companies established in 2005